Berta Bojetu (also Berta Bojetu Boeta; 7 February 1946 – 16 March 1997) was a Slovene writer, poet and actress.

Life
Bojetu was born in Maribor in 1946. She studied at the Faculty of Education at the University of Ljubljana and at the Academy of Performing Arts in Ljubljana. She worked at the Ljubljana Puppet Theatre and was one of the cofounders of the theatre group Koreodrama. She died in Ljubljana in 1997.

In 1996 she received the Kresnik Award for her novel Ptičja hiša (The Birdhouse).

In 2002 an international symposium about Bojetu's work was organised in Maribor. The papers given at the symposium were published in 2004.

She was the mother of the historian and translator Klemen Jelinčič Boeta.

Published works

 Žabon, poetry, (1979)
 Besede iz hiše Karlstein, poetry, (1988)
 Filio ni doma (Filo is not at Home), novel, (1980)
  Ptičja hiša (The Birdhouse), novel, (1995)

References

1946 births
1997 deaths
Slovenian Jews
Slovenian poets
Jewish women writers
Jewish poets
Yugoslav actresses
Slovenian puppeteers
Actors from Maribor
Kresnik Award laureates
University of Ljubljana alumni
Slovenian women poets
20th-century Slovenian women writers
20th-century Slovenian writers
20th-century poets
Writers from Maribor